Johnny Johnston (December 1, 1915 – January 6, 1996) was an American actor and singer who was popular in the 1940s.

Early years
He was born John Clifford Johnston in St. Louis, Missouri, United States.

Radio
In the late 1930s, Johnston had his own program on NBC-Blue.

Recordings
Johnston had several hits on the Capitol label.

Personal life
Johnston was married five times, and had five children.  One of his marriages was to actress Kathryn Grayson at an August 22, 1947 ceremony in Carmel, California. Grayson was his second wife. On October 7, 1948, the couple's only child, daughter Patricia "Patty Kate" Kathryn Johnston was born. Grayson and Johnston separated on November 15, 1950. On October 3, 1951, Grayson was given a divorce from Johnston on the grounds of mental cruelty. Johnston's This Time for Keeps co-star, Esther Williams, claimed in her 1999 autobiography that while making the film, Johnston would read Grayson's intimate letters aloud to the girls in his fan club, including the "all-too-graphic details concerning what she liked about his love-making."
Later he operated a nightclub in New York City.

On July 31, 1952, Johnston married Shirley I. Carmel in Greenwich, Connecticut.

Hit recordings

Filmography
 Star Spangled Rhythm (1942)
 Priorities on Parade (1942)
 This Time for Keeps (1947)
 Unchained (1955)
 Rock Around the Clock (1956)

References

External links

1915 births
1996 deaths
Capitol Records artists
American male pop singers
Traditional pop music singers
Musicians from St. Louis
American radio personalities
Metro-Goldwyn-Mayer contract players
Male actors from St. Louis
American people of French descent
American people of Italian descent
American people of Scottish descent
20th-century American male actors
20th-century American singers
Nightclub performers
Singers from Missouri
20th-century American male singers